The 1959 Claxton Shield was the 20th annual Claxton Shield, it was held in Melbourne, Victoria. It was originally scheduled for Perth, Western Australia, but when teams hinted at pulling out of the Shield that year due to travel costs, the venue was moved. The participants were South Australia, New South Wales, Victoria, Western Australia and Queensland. The series was won by South Australia, claiming their fifth Shield title.

References

1959 in baseball
1959 in Australian sport
1959
July 1959 sports events in Australia
August 1959 sports events in Australia